Mario Novelli (26 February 1940 – 21 August 2016) was an Italian actor. He appeared in more than sixty films from 1962. He died on 21 August 2016.

Filmography

References

External links 

1940 births
Italian male film actors
2016 deaths